Margaret Helena Roney was a sailor from Great Britain, who represented her country at the 1928 Summer Olympics in Amsterdam, Netherlands, as part of the crew of her 8 Metre keelboat Feo, helmed by her brother Ernest. Feo was built at Camper and Nicholsons in 1927, with yard number 352. She was the sister of Esmond Roney and Ernest Roney.

References

Sources
 

Sailors at the 1928 Summer Olympics – 8 Metre
British female sailors (sport)
Olympic sailors of Great Britain
1899 births
1983 deaths